Taşören is a village in the District of Güdül, Ankara Province, Turkey. The village is mentioned in an Ottoman defter of 1523 under the name Kalta and under the same name in a government publication of 1957.

History
In the Roman era, there was reportedly a fortress where the village is now.

According to one story, the village was founded by a Galat Bey and servant, who came from Galata in Istanbul; thus the village was also known in the past as "Galta" or "Galtabeyi."

In the 16th century, the village was listed among those villages whose income was allocated to sipahis under the Ottoman timar system.

Population
In 1845, the village had 28 households, with an estimated population of 140.

In 1980, the village had a population of 215.

In 1990, 145.

In 2000, 89.

In 2008, 79.

In 2021, 80 in winter, 150 in summer.

References

Villages in Güdül District